Paul Claude Gardère (1944, in Port au Prince, Haiti – 2011, in New York City) was a Haitian-born, Brooklyn-based visual artist whose work explored "post-colonial history, cultural hybridization, race, and identity, in and beyond the Haitian diaspora." Gardère's work has been widely exhibited throughout the United States, including at institutions such as the Studio Museum in Harlem, the Figge Art Museum, Lehigh University, Pomona College Museum of Art, and the Jersey City Museum, and is included in a number of prominent institutional collections, including that of Thea Museum of Modern Art in New York, the Studio Museum in Harlem, the Brooklyn Museum, the New Orleans Museum of Art, Schomburg Center for Research in Black Culture, The Milwaukee Art Museum, the Figge Art Museum, the Columbus Museum, the Beinecke Library at Yale University and the Herbert F. Johnson Museum of Art at Cornell University.

Education 
Gardère studied at the Art Students League of New York from 1960 to 1961, and at Yale University summer school of music and art in 1966. He earned his Bachelor of Arts degree from Cooper Union School of Art and Architecture in 1967. He earned his Master of Fine Arts degree from Hunter College in 1972. He was an Artist-in-residence at the Studio Museum in Harlem, the Jamaica Arts Center, Long Island University, and completed a 5-month residency at Monet's Gardens in Giverny, France on a grant from the Lila Acheson Wallace Foundation.

Background 
Gardère was born in Port-au-Prince, Haiti in 1944. He emigrated to New York City in 1959. While studying at Cooper Union School of Art and Architecture in New York, he developed a personal style that blended "Haitian regionalist ideas, painting styles, and cultural symbols" with "the larger aesthetics of Modern art". His work is heavily informed by "religious and mythological symbolism," which he saw "as a way of metaphysical bridge building between cultures, drawing inspiration from the Old Masters and European Catholicism as well as Haitian regionalism and Vodou."

Select exhibitions 
 2017 "Goudou Goudou", Skoto Gallery, New York, NY
 2012-2016 "Restoring the Spirit: Celebrating Haitian Art," Figge Art Museum, Davenport, IA, Pomona College Museum of Art
 2011 "Haitian Art Excerpts: From Renaissance To Diaspora," Kresge Gallery, Berrie Center, Ramapo College of New Jersey, Mahwah, NJ
 2008 "Multiple Narratives II", Skoto Gallery, New York, NY
 2007 "Diaspora: Multiple Narratives", Lehigh University, Zoellner Main Gallery, Bethlehem, PA
 2001 "Marks of the Soul," Ritter Art Gallery, Florida Atlantic University, Boca Raton, FL
 1999 "Recent Works, 1995-1998," Jersey City Museum, Jersey City, NJ
 1998 "Kongo Criollo," Taller Boricua Gallery, New York, NY
 1997 "The Work of Haitian Artist Paul Claude Gardère," Le Centre d’Art and Le Musee d’Art Haitien, Port-au-Prince, Haiti
 1987 "Paul Claude Gardère," Hallwalls Contemporary Art Center, Buffalo, NY

Select awards and residencies 
1998 Joan Mitchell Foundation Award for Painting
1993 Lila Acheson Wallace / Arts International Residence at Giverny, France
1993-94 Artist-in-Residence, Long Island University, Brooklyn Campus
1991 New York Foundation of the Arts Fellowship
1989-90 Artist-in-Residence, Studio Museum in Harlem, New York

References

External links 
 
 "Soul Transfer," 2000
 "Untitled 4," 2010
 "The Throne and the Kingdom"
 "Madonna (Madame Duvalier)," Oil on fiberboard, 1983
 Image gallery from the Joan Mitchell Foundation
 Image gallery from Skoto Gallery

Artists from Brooklyn
Haitian emigrants to the United States
1944 births
Date of birth missing
People from Port-au-Prince
2011 deaths
Date of death missing
Hunter College alumni
Cooper Union alumni
20th-century American artists
21st-century American artists